De Guanajuato...Para America! is the seventh studio album by Mexican group Los Caminantes, released in 1986. The album reached number-one on the Billboard Regional Mexican Albums chart.

Track listing

Chart performance

See also
List of number-one Billboard Regional Mexican Albums from the 1980s

References

1986 albums
Los Caminantes albums